Jiang Wenli (born 20 June 1969) is a Chinese actress, director, producer, and screenwriter. A native of Tianjin, she graduated from the Beijing Film Academy in 1992. Li ranked 52nd on Forbes China Celebrity 100 list in 2014.

Early life
Jiang was born into an affluent family. Her father Jiang Peiji was a railroad engineer and her mother was a railroad telephone operator. Both of her parents love literature and the arts. She is the youngest of three sisters, her elder sister is Jiang Wenjuan. Since Jiang was a young girl, her father taught her to appreciate famous books, paintings, and songs. When she was 5 years old, she dreamt about being a gymnast, so her mother sent her to study dance and gymnastics. However, since her stature did not fit the standards of a gymnast, the coach of the Bengbu city gymnastics team refused to regard her as a formal team member. Afterwards, she spent five years practicing as an informal member. At the age of 17, she took the college entrance examination with the goal of going to normal university. However, she was instead accepted by a water conservation secondary school because her score was five points below the acceptance line for a normal university. In 1986, she graduated from the secondary school and started to work at the Bengbu City Water Company. Her job was to design ways of water transportation for residents. Nevertheless, she was not satisfied with her life at the time and decided to go to Beijing in 1988 to start her new life.

Her niece Ma Sichun (daughter of Jiang Wenjuan) is also an active actress now.

Career
Without any preparation, Jiang was accepted by the Beijing Film Academy. After she became a student of the academy, countless film companies invited her to play roles in their films. Her first role was a nursery school teacher in a TV series called Lily on Cliff, and that series won the Flying Apsaras Awards the same year. Jiang was also a candidate for the Best Supporting Actress award. After this, she played Shuixiu in the movie Li Li Yuan Shang Cao, which won an award at a French film festival. 
The last film of her college period was The Story of Xing Hua in which Jiang played a girl named Xing Hua. After graduating from college, she went to America for a long time before returning to China to continue her career.

After coming back to China, Jiang played a role in Miaomiao Liu's movie The Story of Xinghua. In 1993, she played an important role as Chengyi's mother in the movie Farewell My Concubine, which won the Best Movie Award at the Cannes Film Festival that year. In 1999, Jiang acted in a 20 episode TV series called Lead by the Hand, and for her performance she won one of the Chinese television industry's highest honors, Best Actress, from both the Golden Eagle Awards and the Flying Apsaras Awards. In 2000, for her performance in the film Female Coach & Male Player, Jiang won the Best Actress award from Huabiao Film Awards.

Personal life
Jiang Wenli was married to Gu Changwei, the couple has a son Gu Hehe.

Filmography

Film

Television series

Awards and nominations

Film awards

Television series awards

References

. 
. 
. 
.

External links

 Jiang Wenli on Mtime
 Jiang Wenli on Douban
Jiang Wenli at the Chinese Movie Database

People from Bengbu
1969 births
Living people
Actresses from Anhui
Film directors from Anhui
Chinese women film directors
Chinese film actresses
Chinese television actresses
Chinese film directors
20th-century Chinese actresses
21st-century Chinese actresses